Lazar (JPA: לִיעֶזֶר or לָעְזָר,  Lāzār, ; Serbian, Bulgarian and Macedonian: Лазар,  Lazar) is a male given name or a surname.  An abbreviation of the Hebrew name   or אֱלִיעֶזֶר‎  meaning 'God has helped' which first appeared in Jewish Palestinian Aramaic (see Lazarus and Eleazar ben Shammua) and is especially common in various Slavic languages.

People with the given name

Lazar 
Lazar (1329–1389), duke of Serbia 1371–1389
Lazar of Hilandar (fl. 1404), Serbian Orthodox monk and clockbuilder
Lazar Branković (1421–1458), Lazar's grandson and despot of Serbia 1456–1458
Lazar Baranovych (1620–1693), Ukrainian Orthodox archbishop
Lazar I of Armenia, head of Armenian Apostolic Church (1737–1751)
Lázár Mészáros (1796–1858), Hungarian Minister of War
Lazar Grünhut (1850–1913), Hungarian rabbi
Lazăr Șăineanu (1859-1934), Romanian philologist
Lazăr Edeleanu (1861–1941), Romanian chemist
Lazar Kujundžić (1880–1905), Serbian guerilla fighter
Lazar Drljača (1882–1970), Yugoslav painter
Louis B. Mayer, born Lazar Meir (1884–1957), Canadian-American film executive, co-founder of MGM
Lazar Kaganovich (1893–1991), Soviet politician and Stalinist
Lazar Kogan (1889–1939), Soviet secret police functionary
Lazar Lyusternik (1899–1981), Soviet mathematician
Lazar Lagin (1903–1979), Soviet satirist and children's writer
Lazăr Sfera (1909–1992), Romanian footballer
Lazar Koliševski (1914–2000), Yugoslav politician
Lazar Mojsov (1920-2011), Yugoslav politician
Lazar Yazgur (1928–2000), Soviet painter
Lazar Berman (1930–2005), Soviet classical pianist
Lazar Tasić (1931-2003), Yugoslav footballer
Lazar Radović (born 1937), Yugoslav footballer
Lazăr Comănescu (born 1949), Romanian politician
Lazar Ristovski (born 1952), Serbian actor
Lázár Szentes (born 1955), Hungarian footballer and coach
Lazar Vidovic (born 1965), Australian footballer
Lazar Popović (born 1983), Serbian footballer
Lazar Hayward (born 1986), American basketball player
Lazar Marković (born 1994), Serbian footballer

Llazar 
Llazar Fundo (1899–1944), Albanian communist, journalist and writer
Llazar Siliqi (1924–2001), Albanian poet
Llazar Treska, Albanian politician and mayor of Tirana

People with the surname
Alexandru Lazar, Romanian footballer
Berel Lazar, Chief Rabbi of Russia
Bob Lazar, American conspiracy theorist
Chris Lazar, Canadian actor
Costin Lazăr, Romanian footballer
Curtis Lazar, Canadian hockey player
David Lazar, Romanian footballer
 Ernie Lazar (1945–2022), American historical researcher
Florin Lazăr, Romanian footballer
Gheorghe Lazăr, Romanian scholar
Gracie Lazar, American actress
György Lázár, Prime Minister of Hungary from 1975 to 1987
Ilie Lazăr, Romanian politician
Ingmar Lazar, French classical pianist
Irving Paul Lazar, Hollywood agent
János Lázár, Hungarian politician
Jaryd Lazar, American internet video gamer
John Lazar (1801–1879), Australian theatre manager and mayor
Lora Lazar, Bulgarian crime writer
Mitchell Lazar, American endocrinologist
Mihai Lazăr, Romanian rugby union player
Marc Lazar, French academic
Monika Lazar (born 1967), German politician
Ralph Lazar (born 1967), artist, illustrator and author
Samuel Lazar (1838–1883), Australian theatre manager and mayor
Seth Lazar, Australian philosopher
Valentin Lazăr, Romanian footballer

Fictional characters
Lazar Wolf, wealthy butcher in Fiddler on the Roof

See also
Lazar (disambiguation) 
Tsar Lazar Guard, Serbian nationalist political organization
Lazarević
Lazarev
Lazarevski

References

Jewish given names
Serbian masculine given names
Surnames of Romanian origin
pl:Łazarz (imię)
Surnames of Moroccan origin
Surnames of Ukrainian origin
Surnames of Israeli origin